Phaedon armoraciae is a species of beetle in family Chrysomelidae. It is found in the Palearctic.

References

External links
 

Chrysomelinae
Beetles described in 1758
Beetles of Asia
Beetles of Europe
Taxa named by Carl Linnaeus